This is a list of all the notable places in Multan City and its surroundings.

 Mausoleum of Baha-ud-Din Zakariya
 Mausoleum of Shah Rukn-e-Alam
 Mausoleum of Shah Shams Sabzwari
 Mausoleum of Syed Musa Pak
 Mausoleum of Shah Gardez
 Mausoleum of Mai Maharban (Near Chowk Fawara Multan) is 1000 years old
 Eidgah Mosque
 Old City Multan also called Walled City Multan
 Khooni Burj or Bloody Bastion on Multan City Wall Faseel Multan
 Haram Gate and other gates of Multan
 The City Hall, Multan Municipal Corporation or Clock Tower Multan
 Haram Gate existing old gate of Walled City Multan
 Multan Arts Council building and events
 Multan Fort
 Art Gallery on Damdama of Fort Kohna Multan
 Ibne Qasim Cricket Stadium
 Ruins of Parhaland Temple in Fort Kohna Multan 
 Delhi Gate, Multan
 Multan Garrison Mess or Service club MGM 1880 AD in Multan Cantt
 Ruins of Suraj Kund Temple
 Ahmad Shah Abdali's Birthplace Monument
 International Cricket Stadium Multan
 Mausoleum of Akbar shah near (DHA)
New Shah Shams Colony.[Vehari road Multan]

Monuments

 Birthplace of Ahmad Shah Abdali Monument
 Muhammad Bin Qasim Monument
 Monument of Van Agnew Pattrick Alaxander
 Yadgar-i-Shuhada Monument
 Darbar Shah Hussain Sadozai Near Cardiology Center Abdali Road Multan

Old Gates
 Daulat Gate
 Delhi Gate Multan
 Pak Gate Multan
 Haram Gate
 Bohar Gate
 Lohari Gate Multan

Hospitals

 Nishtar Hospital Multan (Government hospital)
 Multan Institute of Cardiology (MIC) (Government hospital)
 Civil Hospital Multan (Government hospital)
 Children Complex Multan (Government hospital)
 Nishtar Institute of Dentistry Jail Road
 Burn Unit and Trauma Centre (Government hospital)
 Fatima Jinnah Hospital Ghanta Ghar (Government hospital)
 Combined Military Hospital Multan CMH (Government hospital)
 IBN-E-SIENA HOSPITAL & RESEARCH INSTITUTE
 Shehbaz Sharif General Hospital Civil Hospital Azeem Hospital Tariq Road
 Al-Aleem Hospital Dehli Gate Multan
 Medicare hospital City hospital Haleema medical complex Bakhtavar amin hospital Razia iqbal hospitalColonial Buildings

 Ghanta Ghar Multan or Clock Tower Multan
 Memorial Obelisk of Patrick Alexander Vans Agnew in Qasim Bagh commemorating the death of Lt Vans Agnew in 1847 at the hand of the Sikhs
 Civil Hospital Multan
 District Government Buildings

Historical Forts
 Multan Fort or Qilla Kohna, originally called Katochgarh

Mausoleums

 Mausoleum of Baha-ud-Din Zakariya
 Mausoleum of Shah Rukn-e-Alam
 Mausoleum of Shah Shams Sabzwari
 Mausoleum of Shah Gardez
 Mausoleum of Syed Musa Pak Shaheed
 Mausoleum of Mai Maharban (Near Chowk Fawara Multan)
 Mausoleum of Bibi Pak Daman (Near Basti Daira)
 Mausoleum of Hafiz Muhammad Jamal Multani (Near Aam Khas Bagh)
 Mausoleum of Qari Attaullah Mehrvi (Near Jan-Mohammed chock)
 Mausoleum of Sher Shah Syed (Multan-Mazzaffargarh Road)
 Mausoleum of Hamid Saeed Kazmi
 Mausoleum of Hamid Ali Khan
 Mausoleum of Chadar Wali Sarkar
 Mausoleum of Baba BagaSher
 Shrine of Shahadna Shahaid (Near Delhi Gate)
 Totla Mai (Near Haram Gate)
 Mausoleum of Baba Piran Ghaib (Near Samijabad No1)
 Mausoleum of Shah Ali Akbar Suraj Miani 
 Mausoleum of Mother of Shah Ali Akbar Suraj Miani 
 Baba Safra (Near Eidgah)
 Mausoleum of Sultan Peer Katal Jalalapur Pirwala, Multan
 Mausoleum of Sheikh Ismail Mouza umerpur Jalalpur Pirwala, Multan
 Mausoleum of Baba cyclon waley Baba Safra (Near Eidgah)
 Mausoleum of Pir sain Raksha Shareef
 Nuagaza tombs
 Manka
 Dargah Khawaja Ghullam Rabbani
 Darbar Shah Hussain Sadozai Near Cardiology Center Abdali Road Multan.

Museums
 Multan Museum
 Government College Museum

Mosques

 Jamia Masjid Ghousia
 Masjid Al-Khair
 Jamia Zia-ul-Aloom
 Sawi Mosque
 Mosque of Ali Muhammad Khan
 Masjid Phool Hathan
 Eid Gah Mosque
 Masjid Sardar Mohammad
 Mosque Ahmed Shah Abdali
 Mosque Khalil
 Masjid Sameja Wali, Jamal Pura Colony
 Baqarabad Mosque New Multan
 Jalal masjid Gulgasht
 Bilal Masjid Qasim Bela
 Laal mosque of Shalimar colony
 Laal Mosque Cantt
 Mosque Muhammad Bin Qasim, Qila Quhna(First mosque of the Subcontinent)
 Eid Gah Mosque cantt
 Dera Adda Mosque
 Masjid Seith Abu Muhammad cantt
 Masjid Wazir Khan Multan

Temples

 Parhaland Temple in Fort Kohna Multan
 Sun Temple Multan Suraj Kund Temple in Suraj Kund area of Multan
 Jain Mandir in Bohar Gate
 Mandir Shah Majeed'' inside Bohar Gate

Church

 St Mary's Cathedral
 Cathedral of the Holy Redeemer
 Christ Church Multan
 Full Gospel Church Multan
 Multan Cathedral Cantt

Sports

 Multan Cricket Stadium
 Sports Ground.
 MCC ground.
 Qasim Bagh Stadium
 Ayub Stadium
 CMH Sportd ground
 Polo Ground Fort Colony
 Railway Ground
biliwala cricket ground

Notable Intersections
Intersections on major roads become busy markets. These are called chowk.
 Ghanta Ghar Chowk
 Chungi No. 9 Chowk
 BCG Chowk Mumtazabad
 Chowk Kumharanwala or Jinnah Chowk or Gadaffi Chowk
 Chowk khuni burj
 Vihari Chowk
 Bahawalpur Chowk
 Ali Chowk
 Nagshah Chowk
 Bilal Chowk
 MDA Chowk
 Bomanji Chowk Cantt
 S.P Chowk
 Kalma Chowk
 Dera Adda Hassan Parwana Chowk
 Nishter Chowk
 Chowk Pul Barara
 Chungi No.1 Chowk
 Chowk Mumtazabad

Flyovers in Multan

 Chowk Kumharanwala Level II Flyover (Grade Separated)
 Yousuf Raza Gillani Flyover (Longest Flyover in Multan with three extra ramps)
 Pul Mauj Darya Kachehry Chowh Flyover
 Nishter Hospital Flyover
 Kalma Chowk Flyover
 Rasheedabad Chowk Flyover
 Chowk Nagshah Flyover
 Chungi No.9 Flyover
 Railway Flyover Double Phatak

Cemeteries

Haji Baghdadi Graveyard
Chungi No 14 Graveyard
Hassan Parwana Graveyard
Peer Umer Graveyard
Baba Piran Ghaib Graveyard
Kotla Waris Shah Graveyard
Zahid Shah Graveyard
Masoom Shah Road Graveyard
Nishtar Graveyard
Pak Mai Graveyard
Christian Graveyard
Central Graveyard
Sakhi Sultan Ali Akbar Graveyard
Qasimpur Graveyard
Wapda Graveyard
Model Town Graveyard
Basti Nau Graveyard
Punjab Govt Servants Housing Foundation
BZU Graveyard
Kanak Mandi Graveyard
Rajput Graveyard]l
Bhutta Graveyard
Timber Market Graveyard
Dera Basti Graveyard

Markets

Bazars

 Saddar Bazar
 Chowk Bazar
 Chori Bazar
 Sarafa Market
 Chori Sarai Bazar
 Hussain Agahi Bazar
 Purana Shujabat Road Bazar
 Loha Market
 Sabzi Mandi
 Bakar Mandi
 Jafar Bazar
 Gardezi Market
 Chungi No 14 Bazar
 Red Area Market
 Gulshan Market
 Gulgusht Market
∗ Samijabad Market

∗ Suraj Miani Bazar

Trade Centers

 PARACHA INTERIORS COLLECTION (Multan Cantt)
 Prince Departmental Store Multan Cantt.
 Awami Departmental Store, Hussain Agahi
 Chenone Tower
 Bomanji Square
 The United Mall
 New Chase up
 Metro Plaza
 Siddique Trade Center
 Khan Trade Center
 Mall Plaza
 Rehma Center
 City Center (Under-developing)
 Fashion Mall (Under-developing
 The Mall of Multan (Under-developing)
 The Crystal Mall (Under-developing)
 The Shareef Complex (Under development) 
• Buch executive villas
• The Grand

Parks and Gardens

 Cantonment Garden
 Shah Shams Park
 Chaman Zar Askari Lake (Jheel)
 Jinah Park (Shah Rukn-e-Alam Colony)
 Faisal Mukhtar Park 
 Jinnah Water Park
 Joyland Water Park
 Qasim Bagh 
 CSD Park
 Lalak Jaan Park Cantt
 Salahuddin Doger Park
 Gondal Park Double Phatak
 Jalal Park Gulgasht

Chenab Park 
Chenab Park is situated at Muzaffargarh Road, near east bank of the River Chenab in Multan, Pakistan. There is also another park on the west side of the river called  Chenab Kinara Park (Chenab Bank) on the Muzaffargarh side. There are play areas for children, a lake and boating facilities in the park.

Plants Nurseries
 Faiz-e-aam Nursery Multan.
 The Garden Shop Eidgah Chowk Multan.

See also
 List of roads in Multan
 List of places in Lahore
 List of places in Faisalabad

References

Multan
Multan
Multan
Parks in Multan
Parks in Punjab, Pakistan
Parks in Pakistan